Corrientes was the name of two ships operated by Donaldson Line.
 , torpedoed and sunk in 1940
 , in service 1946–1954

Ship names